Thomas Heywood was a playwright and actor.

Thomas Heywood may also refer to:

Thomas Heywood (railway engineer) (1877–1953), British locomotive engineer
Thomas Percival Heywood (1823–1897), 2nd Baronet  Heywood, banker, philanthropist, WWI army officer
Thomas Heywood (antiquarian) (1797–1866), English member of the Chetham Society 
Thomas Heywood (organist) (born 1974), Australian concert organist

See also

Thomas Heyward, signer of the United States Declaration of Independence and of the Articles of Confederation
Thomas Hayward (disambiguation)